Tolima State was one of the states of Colombia.

On July 12, 1861, after raising in arms against the constitutional government of the president Mariano Ospina Rodríguez, the general Tomas Cipriano de Mosquera created the Tolima State, carved out of Cundinamarca State.

In 1863 it bordered:
 Cauca State in the South and the West.
 Antioquia State in the North.

Subdivisions
In 1861, Mariquita Department and Neiva Department were separated from Cundinamarca State to form Tolima State.

In 1869, the state was divided into 3 departments, each further into districts:

 Centro Department (capital Guamo).
 Norte Department (capital Ibagué).
 Sur Department (capital Neiva).

References

See also
Colombian Civil War (1860-1862)

States of Colombia
1861 establishments in the Granadine Confederation